Salassia is a genus of sea snails, marine gastropod mollusks in the family Pyramidellidae, the pyrams and their allies.

Species
Species within the genus Salassia include:
 Salassia bicarinata Robba, Di Geronimo, Chaimanee, Negri & Sanfilippo, 2004

References

External links
 To World Register of Marine Species

Pyramidellidae
Monotypic gastropod genera